Te Motu Olepa is an islet of Vaitupu, Tuvalu that is between the Isles of Mosana and Luasamotu.

References

Islands of Tuvalu
Vaitupu